Navigator (Japanese: ナビゲイター; Translation: Flight of the Navigator) is the debut album by 1986 Omega Tribe. The album is the most popular release of the band and charted at #2 on the Oricon charts.

The album includes the debut song "Kimi wa 1000%," which peaked at #6 on the Oricon charts, but had a different mix than the single's release.

Track listing

Personnel 

Coordinator [Session Co-ordination] – Velvet Line
Design – Masami Oh-Hara
Directed By – Shigeru Matsuhashi
Edited By [Digital Editor] – Kenji Takeda
Engineer [Overdubbing Engineer] – Hiroshi Fujita, Yoshiaki Matsuoka
Engineer [Second Engineer] – Hiroshi Shitamiya, Junichi Fujimori, Mizuo Miura
Executive-Producer – Atsushi Kitamura, Katsuhiko Endo
Guitar, Chorus – Mitsuya Kurokawa, Shinji Takashima
Keyboards, Chorus –  Toshitsugu Nishihara
Lacquer Cut By – Osamu Shimoju
Management [Artist Management] – Triangle Production
Mastered By – Shigeru Buzawa
Photography By [Artist Photographer] – Goro Iwaoka
Producer – Koichi Fujita
Recorded By, Mixed By – Kunihiko "Jr." Shimizu
Vocals – Carlos Toshiki

Charts

Weekly charts

Year-end charts

References 

1986 debut albums
Omega Tribe (Japanese band) albums